Soca or SOCA may refer to:

Places
 Soča, a river in Slovenia and Italy
 Soča, Bovec, Slovenia
 Cayenne – Félix Eboué Airport, by ICAO code
 Soca, a village in Banloc Commune, Timiș County, Romania
 SoCa, Southern California

Other uses
 Serious Organised Crime Agency, a former public body of the United Kingdom
 Soča dialect, spoken in the Upper Soča Valley
 Soca music, a Caribbean music genre
 Socapex, a type of electrical connector used for stage lighting
 Socca, a type of chickpea flour pancake from Provencal and also in Italy as farinata

See also
 Soca Twins, a DJ group from Germany